Natasha Farinea (born 8 February 1986) is a Brazilian volleyball player. She won a silver medal at the 2013 FIVB Volleyball Women's Club World Championship with Unilever Vôlei.

Clubs
  São Caetano (2004–2009)
  Minas Tênis Clube (2009–2012)
  Vôlei Amil/Campinas (2012–2013)
  Rio de Janeiro (2013–2014)
  Praia Clube (2014–2018)
  Osasco/Audax (2018–2019)
  Fluminense FC (2019–)

Awards

Individuals
 2012 Pan-American Cup – "Best Blocker"
 2013 Summer Universiade – "Best Blocker"

Clubs
 2013–14 Brazilian Superliga –  Champion, with Rexona-Ades
 2015–16 Brazilian Superliga –  Runner-up, with Praia Clube
 2017–18 Brazilian Superliga –  Champion, with Praia Clube
 2013 South American Club Championship –  Champion, with Rexona-Ades
 2013 FIVB Club World Championship –  Runner-up, with Rexona-Ades

References

1986 births
Living people
Brazilian women's volleyball players
Universiade medalists in volleyball
Middle blockers
Universiade silver medalists for Brazil
Medalists at the 2011 Summer Universiade
Medalists at the 2013 Summer Universiade
Sportspeople from Mato Grosso do Sul
21st-century Brazilian women